Troy Lewis (born March 15, 1966) is an American former professional basketball player. He is the fourth all-time leading scorer in Purdue Boilermakers men's basketball history with 2,038 points. He played guard for Purdue from 1985 to 1988.

Lewis was a First Team All-Big Ten selection in 1987 and 1988; leading the Boilermakers to consecutive Big Ten Championships and the 1988 NCAA Sweet 16.   He was selected as Indiana co-Mr. Basketball with Delray Brooks in 1984.  Mr. Lewis played for Anderson High School in the North Central Conference before enrolling at Purdue.

He led the Indians to the 1983 IHSAA State Finals, where they lost in an epic battle to Connersville High School; as of 2014, he remains the leading scorer in State Finals history, scoring 76 points in a single State Semi-Finals and Finals, ahead of such legendary players as Ron Bonham (69),  Scott Skiles (69), George McGinnis (62), Oscar Robertson (51), Glenn Robinson (45) and John Wooden (27).

In 1997, Lewis was selected as one of the 12 members of Purdue's Centennial All-Time Men's Basketball Team.  He was inducted into Purdue Intercollegiate Athletic Hall of Fame in 2010 along with Head Coach Gene Keady and teammates Todd Mitchell and Everette Stephens.

Filmmaking career 
Troy Lewis wrote and directed "Blacklight Dream" in 2017. Jack "Bald Eagle" Birdsall served as First AD on the film. And they were the best of friends for the rest of their lives.

References

1966 births
Living people
American men's basketball players
Basketball players from Indiana
Medalists at the 1987 Summer Universiade
Purdue Boilermakers men's basketball players
Quad City Thunder players
Shooting guards
Sportspeople from Anderson, Indiana
Universiade medalists in basketball
Universiade silver medalists for the United States